Nàng Thơm Chợ Đào Rice is a traditional rice variety grown in Vietnam. It is grown in Mỹ Lệ commune, Cần Đước district, in the southern province of Long An, Vietnam. People personify this rice as a "fragrant girl" and called it Nàng Thơm. This rice was historically bought and sold primarily in Đào market- chợ Đào, which is why the rice is named Nàng Thơm Chợ Đào.

History
Since 19th century, under the reign of emperor Minh Mạng, Nàng Thơm Chợ Đào was the primary product used as an offering to the emperor.

Rice varieties